Samuel Agnew Schreiner Jr. (June 6, 1921 – January 14, 2018) was an American writer.
 
Born in Mt. Lebanon, a suburb of Pittsburgh, Pennsylvania, Schreiner graduated from Princeton University in 1942. During World War II he served in the U.S. Army Office of Strategic Services as a cryptographer from 1942–1945. He served in the China-Burma-India theater and became a first lieutenant, receiving both a Bronze Star and Presidential Unit Citation.

Schreiner began his career as a reporter for the McKeesport Daily News and the Pittsburgh Sun-Telegraph from 1946–1951. At Parade in New York he was a writer and assistant managing editor from 1951–1955. He then moved to Reader's Digest where he served as an editor from 1955–1974. In 1974 he devoted himself full-time to writing.

Personal life and death
Schreiner and his wife, Doris Ann (née Moon 1921-2012), married in 1945. They had two daughters.

Schreiner died at his home in Darien, Connecticut on January 14, 2018. He was 96.

Books

 Thine Is the Glory, novel (New York: Arbor House, 1975).
 Set in Pittsburgh, the work is a multi-generational saga set against the rise of an industrial city from the mid-19th century until World War II. The protagonist is Scott Shallenberger Stewart, who begins as a country boy and ends as a moneyed power player like Andrew Carnegie, Henry Clay Frick, Andrew W. Mellon, George Westinghouse, and others.
 Pleasant Places, novel (New York: Arbor House, 1976).
 The Condensed World of the Reader's Digest, nonfiction (Chicago: Stein Publishing, 1977).
 Angelica, novel (New York: Arbor House, 1977).
 The Possessors and the Possessed, novel (New York: Arbor House, 1980).
 The Van Alens:  First Family of a Nation's First City, novel (New York: Arbor House, 1981).
 A Place Called Princeton, nonfiction (New York: Arbor House, 1984).
 The Trials of Mrs. Lincoln, nonfiction (New York: Donald I. Fine, 1987).
 Cycles: Recurring Forces That Can Predict Changes in Your Health, Moods, Relationships, Financial Investments, the Wealth , nonfiction (New York: Donald I. Fine, 1990).
 May Day! May Day!, nonfiction (New York: Donald I. Fine, 1990).
 Code of Conduct, (With Everett Alvarez), nonfiction (New York: Donald I. Fine, 1990).
 Henry Clay Frick, biography (New York: St. Martin's Press, 1995).
 The Passionate Beechers: A Family Saga of Sanctity and Scandal that Changed America, biography (New York: John Wiley, 2004).
 The Concord Quartet: Alcott, Emerson, Hawthorne, Thoreau and the Friendship That Freed the American Mind, biography (New York: John Wiley, 2006).

References

Bibliography
 Contemporary Authors Online. The Gale Group, 2004. PEN (Permanent Entry Number):  0000088332.

1921 births
2018 deaths
Princeton University alumni
Writers from Pittsburgh
People from Mt. Lebanon, Pennsylvania
American cryptographers
American male novelists
20th-century American novelists
20th-century American male writers
Novelists from Pennsylvania
20th-century American non-fiction writers
American male non-fiction writers
United States Army personnel of World War II